Bill Lennard (21 June 1934 – 6 August 1996) was an English professional darts player from Manchester.

Darts career
Lennard played county darts for Lancashire and there are some minor county events that use his name in memorial tournaments.

He enjoyed a successful year in 1976 by winning the prestigious News of the World Darts Championship (representing the Cotton Tree Inn, Manchester), the British Matchplay and the Swedish Open. The World Professional Darts Championship did not begin until two years later, Lennard made his debut at the championships in 1979 but lost his first round match to Tony Clark.

His best run at the World Championships came in 1980 when he reached the quarter-finals, but was beaten by Tony Brown. Tony Clark again beat Lennard in the first round in 1981 and his last appearance in the World Championship came in 1982 when he was beaten by John Lowe.

Lennard was part of the England team which won the WDF World Cup in 1979.

World Championship results

BDO
1979: First round (lost to Tony Clark 0–2)
1980: Quarter finals (lost to Tony Brown 0–3)
1981: First round (lost to Tony Clark 1–2)
1982: First round (lost to John Lowe 0–2)

Career finals

Independent major finals: 1 (1 title)

References

External links
 Bill Lennard Darts Database profile
 

English darts players
1934 births
1996 deaths
British Darts Organisation players
Sportspeople from Manchester